Billingham is an English surname. Notable people with the surname include:

Angela Billingham (born 1939 as Angela Theodora Case),  British Labour politician
Jack Billingham (born 1943), American baseball player and coach
John Billingham (1930–2013), British physician
Mark Billingham (born 1961), English author and actor
Richard Billingham (born 1970), British photographer and artist
Rupert E. Billingham (1921–2002), English biologist

English-language surnames